Jamshedpur is one of the major hubs for industry in  Jharkhand, India, The following are neighbourhoods of the city.

Central

Sakchi
 Jubilee Park
 Jubilee Road
Ambagan
Bhalubasa
Bhuiyandih
Baradwari

Bistupur
 Parvati Ghat Basti
 Millennium Park
 Bistupur Market
 New Rani Kudar
South Park
Dhatkidih

Northern Town
 Straight Mile Road
 Northern Town Road

Tata Steel|Tata Steel Plant Area
 Tata Steel

Golmuri
 A Block
 Punjabi Refugee Colony
 Hindu Basti
 Muslim Basti
 Khawaja Colony
 Sitramdera
 New Sitramdera

Agrico
 Agrico Area
 Agrico Colony

Namda Basti
 Cable Town
 Kailash Nagar
 Kalimati

Northern

Mango (Jamshedpur)|Mango
 Vaatika Green City
 Taibanagar
 Burudh
 Baganshahi
 Sahara City
 Madhav Baugh Colony
 Ripit Colony
 Hill View Colony
 Kedar Bagan
 Balagora
 Ashiana Suncity
 Sankosai
 Subhash Colony 
Chanakayapuri 
Kamar Gora 
Kabir Nagar 
Kanchan Nagar
Jawahar Nagar
Azad Nagar
Zakir Nagar

Jamshedpur|Sidhgora
 Champiya Colony
 Sidhgora Water Tower

Dimna 
 Dimna Road
 Dimna Lake

Turyabera

Baridih

Western

Adityapur
 Banta Nagar
 Kalpanapuri
 Majihtola
 Adityapur Industrial Area
 Adityapur Muslim Basti
 Krishnapur
 National Institute of Technology, Jamshedpur
Golmuri Jugsalai
Adityapur Colony

Gamharia, Jamshedpur|Gamharia
 Sankerpur
 Jagannathpur
 Narayanpur
 Chota Gamaria
 Kalikapur
 Saldih
 Barubad
 Sridungri
 VII - Phase
 Mirudih
 Weekly Market Mirudih
Bhurkadih
Namotola
Dhiraganj
Balrampur
Uparbera
Sikhardih
Sridungri
Industrial Area
4th Phase

Kandra
 Seraikela Kharsawan

Sonari (Jamshedpur)|Sonari
 Sonari Airport
 Ashiana Gardens
 Sangam Vihar
 Sonari Town
 Adarsh Nagar
 Balichela Godown Area
West Layout

Uliyan 
 Vijaya Heritage

Eastern

Birsanagar
 Sunday Market
 Zone 1
 Zone 2
 Zone 3
 Zone 4
 Zone 5
 Zone 6

Tinplate
 Tata Tinplate Company
 Tinplate Basti

Chota Gobvindpur 
 Shehnagar

Telco Colony
 Tata Motors
 Jojobera
Jojobera Power Plant
Indira Nagar
Plaza Market

Bari Nagar 
 Kharanjaghar
 Ganesh Path
 Telco Colony

Dhanchatani 
 Awesome Pahadi

Luabsa

Prakash Nagar 
 Zone 1B

Parsudih
 Pramath Nagar
 Haludbani
 Golpahari
 Makhdumpur
 Sarjamda
 Jasakandi

Rahargoda 
 Gandhara Main Road Marg

Southern

Jilingbera

Kacha

Baridih
 Subarnarekha River
 Niralapath Road
 Dinkar Path

Burmamines
 Kalimati
 Burma Mines Colony
 Loco Colony
 Jemco Azad Basti
 Lakshmi Nagar
 Premanagar
 Raghuwar Nagar
 Kalimati

Jugsalai
 Shiv Nagar
 Bagbera Colony
 Maltadih
 Samoijhupri
 Karandih
 Purihasa
 Khasmahal
 Kumar Chowk
 Patna Colony
 Islamnagar
 Millatnagar
 Shiv Nagar
 Jatajhupri
 Gidijhupri

Nildih
 Nildih Road
 Dalma Road

Dhatkidih
 Dhatkidih Ground
 TATA Football academy
A BLOCK
B BLOCK

Kadma
 Old Farm
 Uliyan
 Bhatia Basti
 Dindli Enclave
 Nirmal Colony
 Kadma Market
 Shastri Nagar
 Ram Nagar

Bagbera|Bagbera Colony
 Islamnagar
 Millatnagar
 Matladih
 Shivnagar
 Jatajhooaupri
 Gidihjhopri
 Karandih
 Kumar Chowk
 Khasmahal
Garabasa

References

Jamshedpur-related lists
Jamshedpur